Patrick D. McGowan (born February 3, 1951) is an American politician and law enforcement officer.

McGowan lived in Maple Grove, Minnesota and served in the United States Air Force. He graduated from Minnesota State University, Mankato with a degree in criminal justice. McGowan served in the Minneapolis Police Department and was commissioned a sergeant. McGowan served in the Minnesota Senate from 1989 to 1994 and was a Republican. McGowan then served as sheriff of Hennepin County, Minnesota from 1995 to 2006.

References

1951 births
Living people
People from Maple Grove, Minnesota
Military personnel from Minnesota
Minnesota State University, Mankato alumni
Minneapolis Police Department officers
Minnesota sheriffs
Republican Party Minnesota state senators